Coniesta forsteri is a moth in the family Crambidae. It was described by Stanisław Błeszyński in 1965. It is found in Pakistan.

References

Haimbachiini
Moths described in 1965